Triumph is an upcoming Bulgarian black comedy film directed by Kristina Grozeva and Petar Valchanov. It will star Maria Bakalova, Julian Kostov, Julian Vergov and Margita Gosheva.

Premise
In the chaotic aftermath of the fall of communism in the 1990s, a task force composed of high-ranking Bulgarian army officers and psychics embarks on a top-secret military operation in the small village of Tsarichina to dig up an elusive alien artifact that would change the course of history and make Bulgaria great again.

Cast
 Maria Bakalova as Slava Platnikova
 Julian Kostov as Private Georgi
 Julian Vergov as Colonel Platnikov
 Margita Gosheva as Pirina Nyagolova
 Stanislav Ganchev as Major Chernev
 Ivan Savov as General Zlatev
 Ivan Barnev as Minister of Defense

Production
The film received first development support from the Bulgarian National Film Center in 2018. In 2019, Kristina Grozeva and Petar Valchanov announced that Triumph was still in development, with filming expected to begin in late 2020 or 2021. In August 2022, Deadline Hollywood reported that Maria Bakalova and Julian Kostov would co-produce the film and lead the cast. It will be the last part of Grozeva and Valchanov's "newspaper clippings" trilogy based on articles published in the local press, after The Lesson (2014) and Glory (2016).

The film is a co-production between Five Oceans, Abraxas Film and the Greek production company Graal Films, and is funded by the Bulgarian National Film Center, the Greek Film Centre, Eurimages, MEDIA, the Bulgarian National Television and ERT. Filming is underway in Bulgaria, and will take place intermittently in 2022 and 2023 with editing in between.

References

External links
 

Upcoming films
Comedy films based on actual events
Bulgarian comedy films
Bulgarian-language films
Films set in the 1990s
Films set in Bulgaria